Liberal Environmental Party (LES) is a green-liberal political party in the Czech Republic. It was established by Martin Bursík as a split from Green Party. The party is pro-European and supports Václav Havel's legacy.

History
The LES participated in the 2014 European Parliament election but failed to win any seats, receiving 7544 votes (0.49%).

The party announced on 12 July 2017 that it would participate in the 2017 legislative election on the electoral lists of TOP 09.

Electoral results

European parliament

Footnotes

External links
Official party website (in Czech)

Green political parties in the Czech Republic
Green liberalism
Liberal parties in the Czech Republic
Political parties established in 2013
Pro-European political parties in the Czech Republic
TOP 09
Green Party (Czech Republic) breakaway groups
2013 establishments in the Czech Republic